Mondaea or Mondaia was a town and polis (city-state) of Perrhaebia in ancient Thessaly. The city appears in an epigraph dated to 375-350 BCE in a list of Perrhaebian towns that offered a joint dedication to Apollo Pythios. It also appears in a decree of proxenia of the year 178 BCE in an inscription at Gonnus. 

Its location has been found near modern Loutro Elassonos.

References

Populated places in ancient Thessaly
Former populated places in Greece
Thessalian city-states
Perrhaebia
Cities in ancient Greece